George Bennet (16 April 1774 –  13 November 1841) was an English missionary from Sheffield, Yorkshire. He travelled widely in Asia.

Life
Bennet was a Congregationalist organiser in Sheffield. In 1821 he set out with Daniel Tyerman, supported financially by the London Missionary Society. They travelled together to China, Southeast Asia, and India.

Bennet stopped in Macau during his Pacific voyage. He was impressed by the garden and aviary of opium trader Thomas Beale, devoting 45 pages of his travelogue to them. Bennet and Tyerman made an extended stay in Tahiti, and Bennet's letters from there were published in the Sheffield Iris by James Montgomery. Tyerman died in Madagascar, where they had set up missions with the support of King Radama I.

After his voyage Bennet gave historical artifacts that he had collected to the London Natural History Museum. He died in London on 13 November 1841.
He is buried with an inscribed monument in his memory in Sheffield General Cemetery.

References

English Congregationalist missionaries
Congregationalist missionaries in China
Congregationalist missionaries in India
Congregationalist missionaries in French Polynesia
Congregationalist missionaries in Madagascar
British expatriates in French Polynesia
British expatriates in Madagascar
British expatriates in China
1774 births
1841 deaths